The Ajova is a river of south-eastern Papua New Guinea. It flows into Collingwood Bay to the southeast of Mount Victory, Papua New Guinea.

References

Rivers of Papua New Guinea
Oro Province